Samsung Medical Center (SMC) is a tertiary hospital located in Irwon-Dong of Gangnam-Gu, Seoul, South Korea. SMC is composed of Samsung Seoul Hospital, Kangbook Samsung Hospital, Samsung Changwon Hospital, and Samsung Life Sciences Research Center. SMC was founded on November 9, 1994.

In 2015, it had a capacity of 1,979 beds and treated 85,208 inpatients and 2,027,211 outpatients.

In 2015, the hospital suffered an outbreak of Middle East respiratory syndrome, and was criticised for its poor handling of the incident.

References

External links
 

Hospital buildings completed in 1994
Buildings and structures in Gangnam District
Hospitals in Seoul
Medical Center
Teaching hospitals in South Korea
Hospitals established in 1994
1994 establishments in South Korea